Bous is a commune and small town in south-eastern Luxembourg. It is part of the canton of Remich.

, the town of Bous, which lies in the east of the commune, has a population of 505.  Other towns within the commune include Assel, Erpeldange, and Rolling.

Population

References

External links
 

Communes in Remich (canton)
Towns in Luxembourg